Marc Marie Jean Baptiste Delmas (28 March 188530 November 1931) was a French Expressionist composer and writer.

Life and career
Marc Delmas was born in Saint-Quentin, Aisne, France, and studied at the Conservatoire de Paris with Xavier Leroux and Paul Vidal. He won the Prix Rossini in 1911 with Anne Marie, Second Grand Prix de Rome with his cantata Le et la Fée Poète and later the Prix Cressent and  Prix Ambroise-Thomas. In 1914 Delmas and Marcel Dupré were tied for first prize on the first ballot of the Prix de Rome, and Camille Saint-Saëns was called in to break the tie. He voted for Dupré, and Delmas took second prize.

Delmas taught music in Paris, and was a biographer of noted musicians. He took part in the choral movement and participated in the Conseil Superieur de la Musique Populaire. He died in Paris at the age of 46.

Works
Delmas was a prolific composer, known primarily for his stage works, but he was also author of choral, solo and chamber music. Selected works include:

Laïs, opera 1908
Sylvette, operetta 1932
Camille, opera comique 
Balade féerique for French Horn and piano
Promenade for Clarinet and Piano (1920)
Lusacienne, rhapsody for violin and orchestra (1928)
Choral et Variations Op.37 for trumpet and piano
Messe de requiem
Le Masque for solo voice
Fantaisie Italienne for clarinet and piano

His music was used in the film The Little Thing in 1923, and recorded and issued on CD including:
Recital Favorites for Clarinet and Piano by Eugene Bozza, Gabriel Grovlez, Andre Bloch, Philippe Gaubert and Marc Delmas (2005)
Musique Française pour Cuivres et Piano by Andre Chpelitch, Marc Delmas, Henri Dutilleux, Pierre Gabaye and Pierick Houdy (2007)
Solos de Concours II: Music from the Premier Prix by Charles-Marie Widor, Arthur Coquard, Charles Edouard Lefebvre, Max D'Ollone and Marc Delmas (2005)

Delmas also wrote books including:
Gustave Charpentier et le Lyrisme Francais (1931)
Georges Bizet, 1838-1875 (1930)

References

External links
 

French operetta composers
People from Saint-Quentin, Aisne
1885 births
1931 deaths
French opera composers
Male opera composers
Prix de Rome for composition
Conservatoire de Paris alumni
French music educators
20th-century classical composers
French male writers
20th-century French composers
20th-century French male musicians
French male classical composers
20th-century French male writers